Mears Peak is a  mountain summit located on the common boundary of Ouray County with San Miguel County, in Colorado, United States. It is situated six miles northwest of the community of Telluride, in the Mount Sneffels Wilderness, on land managed by Uncompahgre National Forest. It is part of the Sneffels Range which is a subset of the San Juan Mountains, which in turn is part of the Rocky Mountains. Mears Peak is situated west of the Continental Divide, and 3.8 miles west of Mount Sneffels.

History 

This mountain's name and location were officially adopted in 1970 by the U.S. Board on Geographic Names to commemorate Otto Mears (1840–1931). Prior to 1970, the USGS placed Mears Peak at a location one mile to the east. Otto Mears was known for his road and railroad building projects through Colorado's San Juan Mountains, which were instrumental in the early development of southwestern Colorado in the late 19th century. Notably, he built the Million Dollar Highway.

Climate 
According to the Köppen climate classification system, Mears Peak is located in an alpine subarctic climate zone with long, cold, snowy winters, and cool to warm summers. Due to its altitude, it receives precipitation all year, as snow in winter, and as thunderstorms in summer, with a dry period in late spring. Precipitation runoff from the mountain drains south to the San Miguel River, and north to the Uncompahgre River via Dallas Creek.

Gallery

See also 

Hayden Peak

References

External links 

 Weather forecast: Mears Peak
 Mears Peak rock climbing: Mountainproject.com
 Mears Peak photo

Mountains of Ouray County, Colorado
Mountains of San Miguel County, Colorado
San Juan Mountains (Colorado)
Mountains of Colorado
North American 4000 m summits
Uncompahgre National Forest